Steve Pollick is a heavy metal guitarist. He is a former member of White Roses and Icarus Witch, and is now an active member of the band Order of Nine.

References

Living people
American heavy metal guitarists
Year of birth missing (living people)
Place of birth missing (living people)